Jenopappius is a genus of braconid wasps in the family Braconidae. There are at least three described species in Jenopappius, found in Africa.

Species
These three species belong to the genus Jenopappius:
 Jenopappius aethiopicus (de Saeger, 1944)
 Jenopappius magyarmuzeum Fernandez-Triana & Boudreault, 2018
 Jenopappius niger (de Saeger, 1944)

References

Microgastrinae